Blížkovice is a market town  in Znojmo District in the South Moravian Region of the Czech Republic. It has about 1,200 inhabitants.

Notable people
Georg Prochaska (1749–1820), Czech-Austrian physician

References

Populated places in Znojmo District
Market towns in the Czech Republic